Ariadnaria alexandrae is a species of small sea snail, a marine gastropod mollusk in the family Capulidae, the cap snails.

Description

Distribution

References

External links

Capulidae
Gastropods described in 1998